Pirates and Poets is a 1983 album released by American singer-songwriter Bertie Higgins.

Track listing
 "As Time Goes By" (0:45)
 "Pirates and Poets" (3:11)
 "When You Fall in Love (Like I Fell in Love with You)" (3:36)
 "Leah" (3:28) 
 "Under a Blue Moon" (3:55)
 "Tokyo Joe" (3:25)
 "Beneath the Island Light" (4:04)
 "Only Yesterday" (3:50)
 "Marianna" (4:09)
 "Pleasure Pier" (3:28)
 "Never Looking Back" (7:18)
 "As Time Goes By (Reprise)" (1:15)

Trivia
 Roy Orbison sang on "Leah."
 The CD version of the album included Higgins' hit single Key Largo as a bonus track.

1983 albums
Bertie Higgins albums